Balzers is a village located in southern Liechtenstein. As of 2019, the village had a total population of 4,642. The main part of the village is situated along the east bank of the Rhine.

History and culture

Historically, the present-day form of the village consists of two different villages, the actual Balzers in the east and Mäls in the west. Not visible to the unaware, the division still persists in the local village culture, where it manifests in half-serious local competition. Some customs, such as the "Funken", a springtime ritual with pre-Christian origins involving a huge bonfire, are still being practised by each separately. The two parts were first mentioned in 842 as Palazole.

Balzers is the home of the Burg Gutenberg, which was built in the 12th century and located on a rocky hill in the centre of the village.

On 7 April 2014, the manager of the Frick & Co. Bank, Jürgen Frick, was shot and killed in a parking garage in the town. The shooter, Jürgen Hermann, was found dead after committing suicide by shooting himself in the head. The event was noteworthy due to Liechtenstein's extremely low crime rate.

Transport

Heliport
Balzers has a heliport available for charter flights . The heliport has no border-control facilities; therefore, the only flights permitted to use it are those heading to and from elsewhere within the Schengen Area.

Economy

Oerlikon Balzers
The headquarters of the major thin film coating, solar and vacuum technology company Oerlikon Balzers is located in Balzers.

Notable people 

 Xaver Frick (1913 in Balzers – 2009) Olympic track and field athlete and cross-country skier. He competed in track sprinting events in the 1936 Summer Olympics in Berlin and cross-country skiing at the 1948 Winter Olympics in St. Moritz. Frick is the only Liechtenstein athlete to date to have competed in both the Summer and Winter Olympic Games. He was awarded a Golden Laurel in 2003 by the government of Liechtenstein for outstanding contributions to sport.
Andrea Willi (born 1955) Minister of Foreign Affairs (1993-2001).
Christine Wohlwend (born 1978), politician.

Twin towns and sister cities
 Saitama, Japan (2000)

See also
Alexander Suvorov

References

External links

Official website

 
Municipalities of Liechtenstein
Liechtenstein–Switzerland border crossings